The World Disc Games (WDG) is a semi-regular event that brings the entire world flying disc community together for a week of overall disc events that allow people to compete in and enjoy disc sports.  Beginning in 1978, and originally called the Santa Cruz Flying Disc Classic, the WDG has its home in Santa Cruz, California, with promoter and hall of fame disc sport player Tom Schot.

Disc sports competitions at the WDG include ultimate, freestyle, disc golf, discathon, self-caught flight, accuracy, distance, and double disc court.  In July 2003, World Disc Games X held in Santa Cruz with over 500 participants.

Notes and references

See also
 Beach Ultimate
  Freestyle Players Association
 Ken Westerfield
 Flying disc games
 Flying disc freestyle
 World Flying Disc Federation

Flying disc tournaments
Flying disc
Disc golf tournaments
Flying disc games